The Gerstein Science Information Centre is the University of Toronto's flagship library supporting the sciences and health sciences. The largest science and health science academic library in Canada, Gerstein has a collection of over 945,000 print volumes of journals and books, and also provides access to over 100,000 online journals and books. The Gerstein Science Information Centre's collection consists primarily of material on the sciences, including the health sciences, medicine, physics, chemistry, biology and their subfields, with the exception of mathematical journals and forestry, botany and geology materials. The Library provides varying degrees of access to students, faculty, external researchers, and members of the public.

History
The Gerstein Science Information Centre is located at 9 Kings College Circle on the University of Toronto campus. The library originally existed as the main University of Toronto library, and maintained this status from 1892 to 1973. In 1973 the humanities and social sciences materials were moved to the then newly built Robarts Library, and the remaining collection was divided between the undergraduate Sigmund Samuel Library and the Science and Medicine Library. In 1997, the Science and Medicine Library was renamed the Gerstein Science Information Centre after a significant donation from a benefactor, the Frank Gerstein Charitable Foundation.

Renovation work

The most recent renovations at Gerstein were similarly funded by the Frank Gerstein Charitable Foundation and the Bertrand Gerstein Family Foundation, and were completed in the fall of 2008. The Gerstein Reading Room, a spacious study area for students restored to its 1892 original state, was the end product of the renovations. The stunning ceiling architecture revealed by the renovation came as a surprise to Diamond and Schmitt Architects, who made their discovery while renewing the heritage wing of the Centre. The renovation also included the addition of group study rooms for students. The previous expansion of 2003, the Morrison Pavilion, provides students with modern study carrels equipped with power outlets and wired Ethernet connections and was possible due to a donation by University of Toronto alumni Russell and Katherine Morrison.

See also
Robarts Library

References

External links

Gerstein Science Information Centre

University of Toronto libraries
University of Toronto buildings